Digital banks in the Philippines are a new formal category of banks which were only approved by the Bangko Sentral ng Pilipinas (BSP), the country's central bank, in 2020. The first such banks launched in the Philippines were Tonik, Overseas Filipino Bank, and UnionDigital of UnionBank Corp. Several more banks were approved by the BSP before 2021, when it announced that it would stop approving the establishment of further digital banks for three years, in order to strengthen the industry and assure healthy competition among its players.

Background 
Digital banking and financial technology have been one of the most rapidly growing industries in Asia, seeing large success in countries such as South Korea, China, and Japan. In Southeast Asia, Singapore is  at the top of the digital banking industry, with the Philippines only recently following suit when the need  for digital transactions rose during the COVID-19 pandemic in 2020. A report by the BSP in 2019 claimed that 70% of Filipinos remained unbanked. A decline in check and ATM transactions, as well as a rise in digital transactions, was also reported in 2020 by the BSP.

Recognizing the necessity to digitalize, the BSP issued Circular No. 1105 on "The Guidelines on the Establishment of Digital Banks" in 2020, allowing digital banks to apply for their formal licenses. The BSP  aims to digitalize 50 percent of transactions and encourage at least 70 percent of Filipinos to open their  own financial accounts by year 2023. The BSP has also announced that it has capped the number of licensed digital banks that will operate in the country to six (6), instead of seven originally planned. It has stopped accepting applications for the digital banking license for three years in order to preserve the competition among the new banks.

Digital banks licensed by the BSP
As of September 2021, the BSP has given digital banking licenses to the six (6) following banks:

 GOTyme - Owned by the Gokongwei Business Group, GOTyme is the group’s foray into digital banking. GOTyme received its digital banking license from the BSP in August 2021, becoming the fifth digital bank with one. It is expected to launch in the second quarter of 2022 and plans to open its own app as well as digital kiosks found in the malls under the Gokongwei Business Group.

 Maya Bank - Maya Bank is owned by Voyager Innovations, PLDT’s financial technology branch and the same company that developed PayMaya. It is the sixth digital bank to get its BSP digital banking license in September 2021. Maya Bank’s products will range from savings accounts to loans. It has no set launch date as of September 2021.

 Overseas Filipino Bank - also known as OFBank, was established in 1906 and was called Philippine Postal Savings Bank. It was acquired by Land Bank of the Philippines, who launched it digitally as Overseas Filipino Bank in June 2020, aiming to assist Filipinos working abroad to send money back to the Philippines in a more seamless manner. Overseas Filipino Bank was given the license to operate as a digital bank by the Bangko Sentral ng Pilipinas in March 2021.

 Tonik - Singapore-owned Tonik, noted for being Southeast Asia’s first 100% private digital bank, was launched in the Philippines in March 2021. The neobank was founded in 2018 and aimed to tap the 70% of the unbanked population in the Philippines. It began pilot operations in late 2020 and received its digital bank license from the Bangko Sentral ng Pilipinas in June 2021, the first purely digital bank to do so. Within its first month of operations, Tonik was able to secure PHP 1 billion in customer deposits.

 UnionDigital Bank - It is a wholly-owned subsidiary of Unionbank (Philippines), a universal bank in the Philippines primarily partnered with the Aboitiz Group, Insular Life, and the Philippines' Social Security System, to operate as a digital bank. UnionDigital Bank's application for an authority to establish a digital bank is approved by BSP on July 15, 2021 and commenced operations on July 18, 2022.

 UNOBank - Backed by DigibankASIA Pte Ltd, Singapore-based UNOBank was the third digital bank to get a digital banking license from the BSP in June 2021. It was founded in 2020 and currently has no specified date for its official start of operations in the country. UNOBank mentioned that its key features include facial recognition, voice identity, and machine learning, while users may avail of products like savings accounts, investments, and loans all on the app that the bank plans to launch.

Banks that offer similar digital and online banking services
The following banks are not licensed by the BSP to operate as digital banks but are offering digital banking and/or online banking services:

 ING Philippines - ING is a Dutch-owned financial services company that has been operating in the Philippines since 1990.  It began its operations providing wholesale lending services to both international and local corporations.  ING was the first foreign bank to be granted a universal banking license in the country.  In 2019, ING Philippines launched their mobile app, which allows users to access their services through an all-digital platform. ING Philippines is closing its retail operations in the country by end of 2022.

 CIMB Bank - is a Malaysian-based universal bank that has 1,080 branches throughout Southeast Asia. It has various entities in the region, including CIMB Bank Philippines. CIMB Bank Philippines was established in December 2018 and officially launched in 2019 as an all-digital banking presence. Its mobile app is called OCTO and users are able to open their accounts and manage transactions through the platform. CIMB was awarded the Best Digital Bank 2021 by the Global Banking and Finance Review.

 DiskarTech - powered by Rizal Commercial Banking Corporation (RCBC), is a digital bank and app whose key features include its languages being a mix of English and Tagalog, addressing the bilingual needs of Filipino users. The app was launched in July 2020 and aims to target unbanked Filipinos. DiskarTech is also the first digital bank to offer a Visayan interface, extending its goal of financial inclusivity to the local mass markets. The app has no required maintaining balance and users can download the app to open an account. 

 Komo by EastWest - Komo is EastWest’s fully digital banking service that was launched in May 2020, during the height of the COVID-19 lockdown in the Philippines. EastWest officials mentioned that Komo combines the convenience of modern digital banking that is backed by the security of an established “brick-and mortar” bank.

 Sea Bank - Sea Bank is owned by Sea Ltd, the parent company of the e-commerce platform Shopee.

 NetBank - formerly Community Rural Bank of Romblon

See also 
 Economy of the Philippines
 Bangko Sentral ng Pilipinas
 Neobanks in the Philippines

References 

Banks of the Philippines
Financial services companies of the Philippines